Elections to the Bristol City Council were held on 7 May 1998 as part of the 1998 United Kingdom local elections. 22 wards were contested.

Results

Avonmouth

Bedminster

Bishopston

Cabot

Clifton

Cotham

Easton

Eastville

Filwood

Frome Vale

Henbury

Henleaze

Hillfields

Horfield

Kingsweston

Lawrence Hill

Lockleaze

Redland

Southmead

Southville

Stoke Bishop

Westbury-on-Trym

References

1998
1998 English local elections
1990s in Bristol